Philippe Chevrier (born 17 December 1960 in Geneva) is a Swiss chef.

Biography 
Between 1976 and 1979, he was apprenticed at the restaurant Le Chat Botté in the Hôtel Beau Rivage in Geneva. His studies completed, he worked for two years as a commis chef at L'Oasis restaurant in  La Napoule and at Le Gentilhomme in the Hôtel Richemond before undertaking two one-year training periods in bakery and confectionery between 1982 and 1983.

In 1984, he spent the year as a chef with Frédy Girardet in Crissier before joining Le Patio restaurant where he was sous-chef de cuisine from  1985 to 1986. In 1987, he was employed as chef de cuisine at Domaine de Châteauvieux in  Satigny, of which he became proprietor in 1989.

He obtained his first  Michelin star in 1991, his second in 1994. He was made a Chevalier de l'ordre du Mérite agricole in 1996 and opened the Café de Peney, also in Satigny,  in 1998. In 2002, he was scored 19/20 in Gault Millau and voted Chef of the Year.

In 2003, he took over the restaurant Le Vallon in Conches, in the outskirts of Geneva, and opened the Epicerie de Châteauvieux in Satigny. In 2004, he opened Domaine de Chouilly, still in the same commune. In 2005, he launched a range of products for retail  and, in 2006, a range of wines (called « Les Vins Philippe Chevrier ») in co-operation with the Geneva winegrowers and prepared by Nicolas Bonnet and the Cave de Genève. The same year, he began gastronomic cruises Lake Geneva aboard the steam boat Savoie in association with the Compagnie Générale de Navigation sur le lac Léman.

His establishments 
 Domaine de Châteauvieux: gastronomic restaurant in Satigny. 
 Café de Peney : café restaurant in Peney-Dessous, 14/20 in Gault Millau
 Restaurant le Vallon : restaurant in Conches, 15/20 in Gault Millau
 Épicerie du Domaine de Châteauvieux : delicatessen of fine products
 Domaine de Choully : location of Philippe Chevrier Le Traiteur SA, Domaine de Châteauvieux in Chouilly
 Bateau Le Savoie : gastronomic cruises on que sur le Lake Geneva in a 1914 steam boat
 Restaurant le Relais de Chambésy in the village of Chambésy (GE)

Publications 
 Philippe Chevrier, Jean Lamotte, Bertola, and Thomas Hensinger Histoires gourmandes, Jouvence 2004, 
 Philippe Chevrier, Jean Lamotte, and Jean-Claude Tabernier, Délices d'automne et d'hiver : Recettes de Damien Coche et son équipe, Éditions Slatkine, 2009

External links 
 Web site

Swiss chefs
1960 births
People from the canton of Geneva
Living people